Henle's slender-legged tree frog (Osteocephalus mimeticus)  is a species of frog in the family Hylidae. It is found in Peru and northeastern Bolivia. Breeding takes place in small streams where the tadpoles develop. It is a locally abundant species that can be threatened by habitat loss in parts of its range.

References

Osteocephalus
Amphibians of Bolivia
Amphibians of Peru
Amphibians described in 1941
Taxonomy articles created by Polbot
Taxobox binomials not recognized by IUCN